David Lowe Macintyre VC, CB (18 June 1895 – 31 July 1967) was a Scottish recipient of the Victoria Cross, the highest and most prestigious award for gallantry in the face of the enemy that can be awarded to British and Commonwealth forces.

Details
After graduating from the University of Edinburgh, the 23 years old, and a temporary lieutenant in The Argyll and Sutherland Highlanders (Princess Louise's), British Army, was attached to 1/6th Battalion, The Highland Light Infantry during the First World War when the following deeds took place for which he was awarded the VC.  On 24 August 1918, and three days later, on 27 August near Hénin and Fontaine-lès-Croisilles, France, Lieutenant Macintyre, when acting as adjutant of his battalion, was constantly in evidence in the firing line and by his coolness under most heavy shell and machine-gun fire inspired the confidence of all ranks. On one occasion when extra strong barbed wire entanglements were encountered, he organised and took forward a party and under heavy fire supervised the making of gaps. Subsequently, when relieved of command of the firing line and an enemy machine-gun opened fire close to him, he rushed it single-handed, putting the team to flight, and then brought in the gun.  The full citation was published in a supplement to the London Gazette of 25 October 1918, and read:

After the war, he entered the Civil Service in the Office of Works and by the time of his appointment as a Companion of the Order of the Bath (CB) in the 1949 New Year Honours, he was Under Secretary for Scotland in its successor, the Ministry of Works. He still held the post at his retirement in 1959.

The medal is now on display in the National War Museum of Scotland, Edinburgh Castle.

References

Monuments to Courage (David Harvey, 1999)
The Register of the Victoria Cross (This England, 1997)
Scotland's Forgotten Valour (Graham Ross, 1995)

External links
Location of grave and VC medal (Edinburgh)
History of Argyll & Sutherland Highlanders

1895 births
1967 deaths
British World War I recipients of the Victoria Cross
Argyll and Sutherland Highlanders officers
British Army personnel of World War I
Companions of the Order of the Bath
People from Islay
British Army recipients of the Victoria Cross
Alumni of the University of Edinburgh
British civil servants
Scottish military personnel